London Packet was a merchant vessel launched on the Thames in 1791. She served the Royal Navy as a Hired armed ship from 31 March 1793 to at least 30 September 1800, and despite some records, apparently for a year or more beyond that. She then returned to sailing as a merchant man until an American privateer captured her in May 1814.

Merchantman
London Packet entered Lloyd's Register (LR) in 1791.

Hired armed ship 
London Packet was commissioned in April 1793 
under Lieutenant J.E. Douglas. Then from May 1794 or so, Lieutenant James Fegan (or Fogan) was captain, with A. Hill as master, at least in 1799.

On 27 February 1795 Lloyd's List (LL) reported that the armed ship London Packet had recaptured Monmouth, Blackburn, master. Monmouth had been sailing from Jamaica to London when the French had captured her. Unfortunately, Monmouth was then lost on the rocks at the Isles of Scilly with two of her crew members being drowned.

London Packet otherwise appears to have had a relatively uneventful career on the Liverpool to Channel station, escorting convoys until at least late 1801. In October 1801 she had left Plymouth for Liverpool with 100 French prisoners. Although, or despite having heard in Falmouth of the pending peace treaty with France the prisoners attempted to take over the ship. Lieutenant Fegan and the officers were able to suppress the uprising within minutes without injury to officers or crew, but with some injuries among the prisoners. The news of the treaty had caused the British to relax their precautions and the prisoners had decided to take advantage of this.

Merchantman
At the resumption of war with France in 1803 the Royal Navy did not rehire London Packet. Instead the ship London Packet returned to mercantile service. The Register of Shipping for 1804 showed her with J.Toone, master and owner, and trade London–Cadiz.  

Captain Thomas Quertis acquired a letter of marque on 29 October 1803.

Captain Richard Rabey acquired a letter of marque on 30 April 1805. 
London Packet reappeared in LR in 1807 with R.Raby, master, Moulen, owner, and trade Hull-Guernsey.

The Register of Shipping (RS) for 1811 showed London Packet with R. Raby, master, Moulden, owner, and trade Hull–Baltic. This entry continued unchanged through the 1813 volume. 

Captain Thomas Domaille acquired a letter of marque on 5 April 1811. LR for 1811 showed her trade as London–Guernsey. LR for 1813 showed her master as Raby, changing to Domville.

Fate
An American privateer captured London Packet, of Guernsey, Domaille, master, on 19 April 1814, as she was sailing from Valencia to Rio de Janeiro.

Citations and references
Citations

References

Schomberg, Isaac (1815) Naval Chronology: Or An Historical Summary of Naval and Maritime Events... From the Time of the Romans, to the Treaty of Peace of Amiens...  (T. Egerton).

1791 ships
Age of Sail merchant ships of England
Hired armed vessels of the Royal Navy
Captured ships